The Usher of the Black Rod, often shortened to Black Rod is the most senior protocol position in the Parliament of Canada. Black Rod leads the Speaker's Parade at the beginning of each sitting of the Senate and oversees protocol and administrative and logistical details of important events taking place on Parliament Hill, such as the opening of parliament and the Speech from the Throne.

The office is modelled on the Gentleman Usher of the Black Rod of the House of Lords in the Parliament of the United Kingdom. Upon the appointment of the first woman to the position of Gentleman Usher of the Black Rod on 20 October 1997, the title was changed to Usher of the Black Rod.

The rod
The usher carries an ebony and gold staff of office modelled on that used in the House of Lords. Canada's original rod is believed to have been made in the 1840s in Montreal for the Legislative Assembly of the Province of Canada, and then transferred to the Senate after Confederation in 1867, but it was lost in the 1916 fire that destroyed Centre Block. The current rod was crafted the same year by then-Crown Jeweller Garrard & Co..

The rod was snapped in half in 1967, and underwent only amateur repairs at the hands of Senator Henry Davies Hicks in his personal workshop; over the years it has additionally suffered scratching, cracking, and loss of pieces. Accordingly, on the occasion of the 150th anniversary of Canada in 2016, the Queen bestowed a restoration by artisans and craftspeople at Windsor Castle under the direction of Adrian Smith, L.V.O., which replaced the central ebony rod itself with a 20th-century ebony walking cane.

The top consists of a lion on its hind legs displaying a shield decorated with the royal cypher of George V of the United Kingdom, the monarch when the rod was crafted, and bearing the motto . Its middle knob is made of silver with maple leaf engravings (in contrast to the oak leaves used in its UK counterpart, which is made of gold), and is engraved with the name of Queen Elizabeth II, inscribed during its restoration.  The base is set with a 1904 gold sovereign, displaying St. George slaying the Dragon.

List of office holders
From 1867 to 1997, the title of the office was Gentleman Usher of the Black Rod. After the first female (Mary C. McLaren) was appointed to the position, the term gentleman was dropped from the title.

 1867–1875: René Kimber
 1875–1901: René Edouard Kimber (Son of René Kimber)
 1902–1904: Molyneux St. John
 1904–1925: Ernest John Chambers
 1925–1946: Andrew Ruthven Thompson
 1947–1970: Charles Rock Lamoureux
 1970–1979: A. Guy Vandelac
 1979–1984: Thomas Guy Bowie
 1984–1985: Claude G. Lajoie
 1985–1989: René Marc Jalbert
 1989–1990: Rene Gutknecht
 1990 – 20 October 1997: Jean Doré
 20 October 1997 – 2001: Mary C. McLaren 	
 2002–2008: Terrance Christopher   	 
 26 May 2008 – 30 September 2013: Kevin S. MacLeod
 1 October 2013 – present: J. Greg Peters

See also
 Procedural officers and senior officials of the parliament of Canada

References

External links 

Ceremonial officers in Canada